Tommy Semmy (born 30 September 1994) is a Papua New Guinean footballer who currently plays for Dandenong City, on loan from Altona Magic in NPL Victoria  and the Papua New Guinea national team.

Club career
After making a name for himself playing village football, Semmy played for Besta United PNG of the Papua New Guinea National Soccer League for two seasons beginning in 2013. In 2015, he moved to defending league champions Hekari United and appeared for the club during the 2014–15 OFC Champions League, including in a match against Vanuatu's Tafea in which he scored a goal after an individual effort. He scored again against Tefana in a 3–2 victory in the team's final group stage match. Semmy's two goals were enough to place him tied for fourth place in the scoring charts for the final stages of the tournament. He also played for the club in the 2016 OFC Champions League, scoring two goals in three matches of the group stage. His goals came against AS Lössi of New Caledonia and Suva of Fiji.

In July 2016 it was announced that Semmy, along with three other Hekari players, signed for Marist FC of the Solomon Islands S-League.

In 2017 Semmy joined Malaita Kingz F.C., also of the Telekom S-League. He won the league Golden Boot award that year with 17 goals.

International career
In 2013, Semmy was part of Papua New Guinea's squad for the 2013 OFC U-20 Championship. During the tournament, he made one appearance. He was then named to the squad for the 2015 Pacific Games which were held in Papua New Guinea. The team won the bronze medal, marking the nation's first medal for football at the Pacific Games since 1987. The tournament also doubled as the OFC Men's Olympic Qualifying Tournament for the 2016 Summer Olympics. In preparation for the Pacific Games, manager Ricki Herbert named him to the squad for a pair of friendlies against the Solomon Islands. He scored a brace in the second match as Papua New Guinea won 2–1.

Semmy made his senior international debut in 2014 in a friendly against Singapore. He was named to Papua New Guinea's squad for the 2016 OFC Nations Cup and scored his first senior goal in the nation's opening match against New Caledonia on 29 May. He was given a red card and sent off later in the match.

Career statistics

International

International goals
Stats correct as of 24 March 2022.

Achievements

Club
Telikom NSL Cup Champion: 2015–16

International
Pacific Games Third Place: 2015
OFC Nations Cup Runners-up: 2016

References

External links
 
 
 

1994 births
Living people
Hekari United players
Papua New Guinean footballers
Association football forwards
Papua New Guinea international footballers
New Zealand Football Championship players
2016 OFC Nations Cup players
Altona Magic SC players